Veolia Environnement S.A., branded as Veolia, is a French transnational company with activities in three main service and utility areas traditionally managed by public authorities – water management, waste management and energy services. It previously also managed transport services through its subsidiary Veolia Transport (later Transdev) until January 2019. In 2012, Veolia employed 318,376 employees in 48 countries. Its revenue in that year was recorded at €29.4 billion. It is quoted on Euronext Paris. It is headquartered in Aubervilliers.

Between 1998 and 2003 the company was known as Vivendi Environnement, having been spun off from the Vivendi conglomerate, most of the rest of which became Vivendi. Prior to 1998 Vivendi was known as Compagnie Générale des Eaux.

In 2014, following a major restructuring, the company adopted the unaccompanied Veolia name across its businesses.

History

1853–2003: Compagnie Générale des Eaux & Vivendi

On 14 December 1853, a water company named Compagnie Générale des Eaux (CGE) was created by an Imperial decree of Napoleon III. In 1853, CGE obtained a concession in order to supply water to the public in Lyon, serving in this capacity for over a hundred years. In 1860, it obtained a 50-year concession with the City of Paris.

For a hundred years, Compagnie Générale des Eaux remained largely focused on the water sector. However, following the appointment of Guy Dejouany as CEO in 1976, CGE extended its activities into other sectors with a series of takeovers.

Beginning in 1980, CGE began diversifying its operations from water into waste management, energy, transport services, and construction and property. It did so by acquiring:
Compagnie générale française des transports et entreprises (CGFTE), created from Compagnie Générale Française de Tramways (CGFT) (originally founded in 1875) in 1953. It was absorbed into CGEA Transport (later Connex).
Compagnie Générale d'Entreprises Automobiles (CGEA), which specialized in industrial vehicle and later divided into two branches: The transport division became Connex in 1999 and the waste management and environmental services became Onyx Environnement in 1989. CGEA was created in 1912.
Compagnie Générale de Chauffe (CGC) (and also later the Montenay group in 1986), with these companies later becoming the Energy Services division of CGE, and later renamed "Dalkia" in 1998. CGC was created in 1935.

In 1998, CGE changed its name to "Vivendi", and sold off its property and construction divisions the following year. Vivendi Environnement was formed in 1999 to consolidate its environmental divisions. Its divisions at the formation of Vivendi Environnement were:
Vivendi Water (only renamed in 1999)
Dalkia (originally CGC and already renamed since 1998)
Onyx Environnement (originally part of CGEA and already branded since 1989)
Connex (remaining part of CGEA )

Vivendi went on to list on the New York Stock Exchange (as "V"), and in December, announced a major merger with Canal+ and Seagram, the owner of Universal Studios film company, to become Vivendi Universal and now named Vivendi.

In July 2000, Vivendi Environnement was divested through IPOs in Paris and later New York in October 2001). Initially, Vivendi Universal retained a 70% stake in Vivendi Environnement in 2000, but by December 2002, it was reduced to 20.4%. In 2003, Vivendi Environnement was renamed to Veolia Environnement.

2003 – present: Veolia
As a result of Vivendi Environnement spinning off from its parent Vivendi Universal in 2002, in 2003, Vivendi Environnement was renamed to Veolia Environnement. In 2005, the name "Veolia" was established as an umbrella brand for all of the Group's divisions (water, environmental services, energy services and transport) and a new logo was created. The names of the divisions at the time of rebranding were:
Veolia Water (originally Vivendi Water)
Dalkia (no change in name, but became a joint venture with Électricité de France (EDF) in 2000)
Veolia Environmental Services (originally Onyx Environnement)
Veolia Transport (originally Connex)

In November 2009, Antoine Frérot has become the Chairman and the CEO of the Group after succeeding Henri Proglio who has been appointed CEO of Électricité de France. The change has been part of a huge politico-financial scandal in France as Proglio kept executive positions – and subsequent salary – in both companies until public criticism forced him to give up his Veolia revenues.

Its Veolia Water division remains the largest private operator of water services in the world.

In March 2011 the company announced the formation of Veolia Transdev, the result of the combination of its transport subsidiary Veolia Transport with Transdev, a subsidiary of Caisse des Dépôts. Veolia Transdev is the world's private-sector leader in sustainable mobility with more than 110,000 employees in 28 countries.

In July 2011, amid disappointing financial results, the company announced the launch of new restructuring plans and redeployment of assets and businesses. In December 2011, Veolia announced a €5bn divestment program over 2012–2013. The company would comprise only three divisions (Water, Environmental Services and Energy Services). The transport businesses Veolia Transdev would be divested. Veolia sold a 20% share of Veolia Transdev (now called Transdev) to Caisse des Dépôts in December 2016 and continued to hold a 30% share. In January 2019, the 30% share was sold to the Rethmann Group, the owner of Rhenus.

In July 2022, Estelle Brachlianoff has become the CEO of the Group after succeeding Antoine Frérot who will remain as Chairman of its Board.

Operations

Overview
Veolia is established in 48 countries, with employees across the globe in 2012:
 France: 28%
 Europe (not including France, Central and Eastern European countries): 23%
 Central and Eastern Europe countries : 13%
 China and Asia-Pacific: 12%
 South America: 10%
 Africa and Middle-East: 6%
 North America: 5%

The company has 2,573 subsidiaries around the world.

Water

Veolia Water is the world leader in water services. It handles water and wastewater services for clients in the public sector and in various industries. It also creates and constructs the required technology and infrastructure. In 2012, Veolia Water employed 89,094 people and recorded revenue of €12.078 billion 37.2% of its revenue comes from France, 30.2 from other European countries, 8.8% from Americas, 16.2% from Asia and 7.6% from Africa and the Middle East.

Veolia Water was renamed from Vivendi Water in 2005, which was renamed from CGE water division in 1999.

Waste management

Veolia Environmental Services operates waste management services around the world, including the treatment of hazardous and non-hazardous liquid and solid waste. It also deals with the collection and recycling of waste.

Veolia Environmental Services was originally part of the CGEA, created in 1912 and acquired by CGE in 1980. It was renamed to Onyx Environnement in 1989, and then again renamed to Veolia Environmental Services in 2005.

Energy
In 1998, the energy service division of the CGE, originally the Compagnie Générale de Chauffe/Groupe Montenay prior to 1995, was renamed to Dalkia. It ran the business as a joint venture with Électricité de France (EDF) from 2000 until 2014, when it purchased Dalkia's international operations in full, and EDF bought its French operations. The company's services include maintaining and managing heating and cooling systems, making plants more energy efficient, and selecting the most adapted energies. In 2012, Dalkia employed 49,824 employees and recorded revenue of €7.664 billion (France 42%, Continental Europe 24%, Southern Europe 14.5%, Northern Europe 8%, North America 3%, China 1.5%, other countries 7%).

In North America, Veolia Energy traded under the Trigen Energy name until February 2011. It was the largest operator and developer of efficient district energy (heating, cooling, and cogeneration) systems in North America, located in ten major U.S. cities. It also provides facility operations, energy management, and advisory services. On December 30, 2019, Veolia sold its U.S. district energy assets to Antin Infrastructure Partners, which renamed the business Vicinity Energy.

In Latin America, Proactiva was a 50-50 joint venture formed in 1999 between Veolia Environnement and Fomento de Construcciones y Contratas (FCC), until Veolia bought the other 50% share from FCC in 2013. As a result, Veolia now owns 100% of Proactiva.

Former operations

Transport

Transdev (formerly Veolia Transdev) was formed in 2011 from a merger of Veolia Transport with the old Transdev, a subsidiary of Caisse des Dépôts. Currently, Veolia owns 30% of the company's shares.

Prior to the merger, Veolia Transport was the transport division of Veolia. It was originally part of the CGEA, which was acquired in 1980, and the transport division was then renamed Connex in 1999, then finally renamed to Veolia Transport in 2005.

At the time of merger, Veolia Transport recorded revenues of €7.863 billion in 2011 (For 2010 : Europe 83%, included France 37.1%, North America 13.2%, Asia-Pacific 3.7%). It employed 101,798 people. It worked with public authorities under public-private partnerships to manage public transit systems (buses, trains, metros, ferries, etc.). On 6 December 2011 Veolia Environment, seeking to reduce debt and focus on its core businesses of water, waste and energy, announced that it will eventually sell its share in Veolia Transdev, within a two-year time frame, by when its own activities will have been reorganized. After this announcement, the Caisse des Dépôts et Consignations, for its part, officially reiterated its commitment to Veolia Transdev and its continued support as a shareholder to the group's development.

In early 2012 it was reported that Cube Infrastructure, a fund controlled by the French bank Natixis (Groupe BPCE), was likely to acquire about half of Veolia's stake in Transdev. The Caisse des Dépôts would take over the other half. This was later changed in October 2012 to Caisse des Dépôts acquiring 10% of the shares from Veolia. This however was not implemented. In December 2016, CDC finally bought 20% shares from Veolia. As a result, Veolia's share on the company reduced to 30%.
This was sold in January 2019, marking Veolia's exit from the transport sector.

Financial information
On 31 December 2012, shares in Veolia Environnement were held as follows: 9.3% by Caisse des Dépôts et Consignations (primary shareholder), followed by Groupe Industriel Marcel Dassault (6.3%), Groupama (5.42%), Velo Investissement (4.73%), Électricité de France (4.22%), Veolia Environment (2.73%). Public and other institutional investors the remaining 67.3%.

Veolia issued two profit warnings in 2011 and announced plans to quit half of the 77 countries where it does business. It launched a €5 billion ($6.4 billion) fire sale of assets. The company and its top executives were facing the prospect of a U.S. class-action lawsuit in January 2012 over allegations that they made "misleading" statements between 2007 and 2011 about its financial well-being. The company, which was described as "struggling" by the Financial Times, said that a complaint had been filed against it in New York for violation of U.S. federal securities laws. Veolia's shares were the worst performer on France's CAC 40 index in 2011, falling 60%.

The following is a summary of data (in millions of euros):

Stock market data
Data for Veolia Environnement, as listed on the New York Stock Exchange.
 Market capitalisation on 31 December 2010: $15.27 billion

On the Paris Bourse, Veolia Environnement is part of the CAC 40 index of shares.
 Number of shares outstanding on 31 December 2012: 522,086,849
 Market capitalisation on 14 September 2012: €4.98 billion

Corporate social responsibility
The company's sustainable development activities are diverse. Because it operates in four sectors with a huge potential impact on the environment, both the risks and opportunities presented by sustainable development activities are substantial. The company's sustainability efforts are furthered by its Foundation and Institute which emphasize innovation and research.

The Veolia Foundation
The Veolia Foundation supports non-profit activities related to sustainable development, professional continuous development and the protection of the environment in France and overseas. The Foundation supports projects through financial aid and voluntary services provided by its employees. It also supports emergency relief operations in collaboration with humanitarian organisations.

Following the 2010 Haiti earthquake, the Veolia Foundation dispatched 30 tons of emergency supplies (mainly water treatment units) via French Red Cross air transportation. The Foundation also sent Veolia technical experts to provide water to the disaster's victims.

Institut Veolia
The Institut Veolia was created in 2001 to provide insights into major global challenges such as climate change, urbanisation and various economic, social and cultural issues related to the environment. The institute is built around a committee that brings together seven experts and an international network of researchers and experts. Its activities include organising conferences and publishing articles and reports.

Research and development
As of 31 December 2009, the Group's research and development investments reached €89.8 million (€92.1 million in 2008, €84.6 million in 2007).

The Research and Innovation division includes 850 experts and supports around 200 scientific partnerships with private and public organisations. The division focuses on four main issues:
 Manage and preserve natural resources
 Control impacts on natural environments
 Care for health and living environments
 Develop alternative sources of energy

Programmes 
Veolia's R&I division has determined nine main development programmes through which a number of research projects are managed:
 Waste collection, sorting, and beneficial re-use
 Sustainable city and building management
 Energy efficiency
 Environmental and health standards
 New activities
 Bioresources
 Drinking water
 Wastewater

Operating events

West Carrollton plant explosion
On 4 May 2009, a Veolia Environmental Service's plant in West Carrollton, Ohio, United States, exploded. The blast leveled two buildings on the property which were a laboratory and a building that had several 200,000 gallon chemical tanks. This particular plant handles fuel blending among other services. Two workers at the plant were injured in the blast. The explosion caused $50 million in damage to the plant itself. More than a dozen homes up to a mile radius from the blast were also damaged due to the explosion.

Fatal accident in Gatlinburg 
Two workers died after a catastrophic mechanical failure in April 2011 at a waste water treatment plant in Gatlinburg, Tennessee, United States, owned by the local municipality and operated by Veolia Water. At least 1.5 million gallons of a mix of storm and sewage water were spilled into a nearby river after a sewage-holding wall collapsed.

Controversies

Veolia v Lithuania

In 2017, French company Veolia sued Lithuania in Stockholm arbitration court demanding about 100 million euros in damages. Veolia alleges that Lithuanian government is involved in illegal conduct and that it expropriated Veolia's investments. This is Veolia's second arbitration lawsuit against Lithuania after it sued Lithuania in Washington arbitration court in 2016.

Relations with Israel
In February 2011 the Tower Hamlets London Borough Council of the London borough of Tower Hamlets, voted to review its position with Veolia and place no further contracts with it, after claiming that Veolia's work for the Israeli government assisted the "continued oppression of the Palestinian people".

The Justice and Peace Commission, part of the Catholic Church in England, urged London municipalities to stop doing business with Veolia because of its involvement with illegal settlements. Veolia denied wrongdoing.

Palestinian human-rights organization Al-Haq instructed lawyers in the Netherlands to submit a formal objection against the decision of Stadsregio Arnhem Nijmegen, a municipality, to award a public transport concession to Hermes, the Dutch subsidiary of Veolia Transdev. The objection was based on Veolia's involvement in what Al-Haq claims are Israel's violations of international law.

In a 2012 interview with the Israeli press, Veolia's Denis Gasquet, senior executive vice president, admitted that Veolia had been under pressure from pro-Palestinian groups in Europe, particularly over the Jerusalem Light Rail. Parties within Veolia had argued that the group was losing tenders as a result, but Gasquest said he did not know of any tenders lost due to Veolia's activities in Israel. He confirmed Veolia's intention to stay in Israel and the occupied Palestinian territories, while exiting the transport business.

On 1 April 2015, the company announced on its website "Veolia closes the sale of its activities in Israel." This was taken by supporters of the BDS (Boycott Divestment and Sanctions) movement to signify a success for their campaigning efforts: "The sale follows a worldwide campaign against the company’s role in illegal Israeli settlements that cost the firm billions of dollars of lost contracts."

Unpaid internships
Veolia offered unpaid internship positions under the Irish government's JobBridge initiative. This scheme was opposed by left-wing political groups, who claim it amounts to free labour and can cause a claimant who refuses many such offers to fall foul of a provision in the Irish Social Welfare that allows benefits to be withdrawn from unemployed who were fired.

Flint water crisis 

On 22 June 2016, Michigan Attorney General Bill Schuette began its first civil action in the Flint water crisis by filing suit against Veolia North America and Lockwood, Andrews & Newnam (LAN) who were hired to consult Flint water plant officials after the switch to the Flint River in April 2015. The lawsuit accuses Veolia and LAN of professional negligence and public nuisance. Veolia is also accused of fraud. Veolia called the accusations "baseless, entirely unfounded and appears to be intended to distract from the troubling and disturbing realities that have emerged as a result of this tragedy". And added: "In fact, when Veolia raised potential lead and copper issues, city officials and representatives told us to exclude it from our scope of work because the city and the EPA were just beginning to conduct lead and copper testing."

See also

Distributed generation
Veolia Transport
Water privatization

References

External links

 
Conglomerate companies of France
Construction and civil engineering companies of France
Energy companies of France
Multinational companies headquartered in France
Waste management companies of France
Water companies of France
Companies based in Paris
French companies established in 2003
Conglomerate companies established in 2003
Energy companies established in 2003
Corporate spin-offs
Former Vivendi subsidiaries
Holding companies of France
CAC 40
Companies listed on Euronext Paris
French brands
Construction and civil engineering companies established in 1853
French companies established in 1853
Construction and civil engineering companies established in 2003